

Le Jardin de Heavenly is the second album by twee pop band Heavenly. The album was released on Sarah Records in the United Kingdom and K Records in the United States.

Beat Happening's Calvin Johnson sings on the track "C is the Heavenly Option."

Critical reception
Entertainment Weekly wrote that "by keeping the sound sassy and the singing strong, Heavenly’s Le Jardin de Heavenly is adorable without being coy." Melody Maker wrote that the album "recreates only the most stylised cliches of childhood." Greil Marcus described the album as "Beatles echoes cut with a present-day cynicism so light it merely seems like doubt."

Pitchfork said, "Stacked vocal harmonies and sugary guitars mark Le Jardin de Heavenly as quintessentially '90s indie pop, but it's the band's lyrical benevolence that makes these songs so tasteful."

Track listing
 "Starshy"
 "Tool"
 "Orange Corduroy Dress"
 "Different Day"
 "C is the Heavenly Option"
 "Smile"
 "And the Birds Aren't Singing"
 "Sort of Mine"

K Records reissue

Track listing
 "Starshy"
 "Tool"
 "Orange Corduroy Dress"
 "Different Day"
 "C is the Heavenly Option"
 "Smile"
 "And the Birds Aren't Singing"
 "Sort of Mine"
 "So Little Deserve"
 "I'm Not Scared of You"

References

External links
Le Jardin de Heavenly on K Records

Heavenly (British band) albums
1992 albums